Central Jail Rawalpindi (also known as Adiala Jail) is a prominent prison in Rawalpindi, Pakistan.

History
The Central Jail Rawalpindi was built from the late 1970s and early 1980s during the military regime of General Muhammad Zia-ul-Haq, after the execution of Zulfiqar Ali Bhutto, the ex-Prime Minister of Pakistan on 4 April 1979 in District Jail Rawalpindi. The older jail was demolished and converted into Jinnah Park. The jail is situated in Rawalpindi - Adyala Road near village Dahgal about 13 kilometres toward west of district courts and the defunct/demolished old District Jail Rawalpindi. The village Adyala is about 4 kilometres west of the jail.

Notable prisoners
 Erik Audé: American actor, stuntman, restaurateur, and professional poker player who was arrested and imprisoned in Pakistan. 
 Hanif Abbasi: Former MNA from Rawalpindi.
 Ayyan Ali: model and singer.
 Muhammad Safdar Awan, son in law of Nawaz Sharif and former Member of the National Assembly (MNA) from Rawalpindi and Mansehra.
 Zulfikar Ali Bhutto: former president of Pakistan and father of Benazhir Bhutto.
 Yousuf Raza Gillani: Former Prime Minister of Pakistan.
 Mirza Tahir Hussain: Served eighteen years in the jail for the murder/manslaughter of a taxicab driver. Released on 17 November 2006 on parole.
 Lieutenant General Javed Iqbal (Retired) - Sentenced to 14 years of rigorous imprisonment by a military court on account of spying. Held key positions in the military during his active service, including director-general of military operations, which is responsible for planning and executing all operations inside and outside of Pakistan. Also held the post of adjutant-general, who supervises discipline and accountability within the forces.
 Zakiur Rehman Lakhvi: alleged November 2008 Mumbai Attacks mastermind. Served six years on terrorism charges.
 Allama Mashriqi:  British Indian, and later, Pakistani mathematician, logician, political theorist, Islamic scholar and the founder of the Khaksar movement.
 Maryam Nawaz: daughter of Nawaz Sharif.
 Mumtaz Qadri: Assassin to the former Punjab Governor Salman Taseer.
 Saifur Rehman, chairman of National Accountability Bureau.
 Raja Rizwan : Pakistan Army Brigadier and military attache - Sentenced to death by a military court on account of spying.
 Nawaz Sharif, former Prime Minister of Pakistan from 1990-1993, 1997-1999, 2013-2017.

See also

 Government of Punjab, Pakistan
 Headquarter Jail
 National Academy for Prisons Administration
 Punjab Prisons (Pakistan)
 Prison Officer

References

Prisons in Pakistan